Neil Mullarkey  is an English actor, writer and comedian.

Early life and education
From 1972—1979, Mullarkey was educated at Kingston Grammar School, an independent school for boys (now coeducational), in Kingston upon Thames, followed by Robinson College at the University of Cambridge, where he was a member of the Footlights and was Junior Treasurer during Tony Slattery's term as president. He became president in 1982 with Nick Hancock, Steve Punt and Hugh Dennis as his contemporaries. Mullarkey formed Hancock & Mullarkey with Hancock, performing their act (which consisted of spoofing television shows' title sequences to that show's accompanying theme music) several times on television. This included Doctor Who, Kojak, and Dad's Army.

Career
Mullarkey has been in a double act with Tony Hawks called the Timid Twins.

In the mid-1980s, he teamed up with Mike Myers as 'Mullarkey and Myers'. They would perform sketches based on their shared love of cartoons, B-movies and bad TV. They played around the burgeoning London pub circuit, particularly at the George IV in Chiswick, where they often shared the bill with the young Hugh Grant, then plying his trade in the Jockeys of Norfolk revue. As their fame increased, Mullarkey and Myers toured the UK, ending in a sold-out season at the Edinburgh Festival.

The two appeared as 'The Sound Asleep Club' on TV-am's 'Wide Awake Club', a children's TV show hosted at the time by Tommy Boyd. Mike eventually returned to Toronto, but Mullarkey would briefly join him to revive  'Mullarkey and Myers' in Canada. Later still, he appeared in Myers' début in Austin Powers: International Man of Mystery, as the Customs Officer who freaks Austin out with his Swedish-made penis pump. (He also appeared again in Goldmember and helped Mike Myers with uncredited rewrites of So I Married An Axe Murderer).

As a founding member of The Comedy Store Players, he is regularly performing on the UK comedy circuit.

Theatre
He is a founder member of The Comedy Store Players, and still appears with them regularly at London's Comedy Store.

He has written and performed four one-man shows;
A Bit of Quiet Fun
Memoirs of Lord Naughty
All That Mullarkey
Don't Be Needy Be Succeedy

Don't Be Needy Be Succeedy won the Fringe Report Award for Best Satire of 2002. In it Mullarkey plays L. Vaughan Spencer, Life Coach, Self-Help Guru and Gangsta Motivator. The book Don't Be Needy Be Succeedy: The A to Z of Motivitality was published by Profile Books in November 2008.

Mullarkey starred with Eddie Izzard in the sell-out West End run of One Word Improv and has guested with The Groundlings in Los Angeles and The Second City in Toronto.

Television
On television, his appearances include:

Whose Line is it Anyway
The Manageress
Lovejoy
Smith and Jones
Saturday Live
QI
Have I Got News For You
Carrott Confidential
Paul Merton: The Series
Absolutely
Colin's Sandwich

He was a writer on Tony Hawks's show Morris Minor's Marvellous Motors and co-wrote (with Greg Proops) The Amazing Colossal Show for BBC2. He hosted American Freak for America's Comedy Central network.

He also does regular TV advert voiceover work.

Cinema
Mullarkey has acted feature films, including Leon the Pig Farmer, Austin Powers: International Man of Mystery, Austin Powers in Goldmember, and Spiceworld.

Radio
Mullarkey hosted Missed Demeanours for BBC Radio 4, was a regular performer on Bits from Last Week's Radio, co-wrote and starred in FAB TV and has appeared on Just a Minute, The News Quiz, Quote...Unquote, I'm Sorry I Haven't a Clue, Loose Ends, In Touch and The Unbelievable Truth. He wrote and presented the documentary Ten Years of the Comedy Store Players.

References

External links
 
 Profile, neilmullarkey.com
 Details, improvyourbiz.com

1961 births
Alumni of Robinson College, Cambridge
English male film actors
English male stage actors
English male television actors
English radio personalities
Living people
Male actors from Hertfordshire
People educated at Kingston Grammar School